Yevgeny Ivanovich Postnikov (born 16 April 1986) is a Russian-born Kazakhstani former professional footballer.

Career
In February 2014, Postnikov went on trial with both Irtysh Pavlodar and Astana, going on to sign a contract with Astana in March 2014, whilst also taking Kazakhstani citizenship. On 24 August 2016, Astana announced that before Postnikov was loaned to FK Ventspils, he had signed a new contract with the club. On 17 February 2021, Postnikov left Astana after his contract was terminated by mutual consent.

Career statistics

International

Statistics accurate as of match played 21 March 2019

Honours 
Ventspils
 LMT Virslīga (1): 2011
 Latvian Cup (1): 2010–11
Astana
 Kazakhstan Premier League (4): 2014, 2015, 2016, 2017
 Kazakhstan Super Cup (1): 2015

References

1986 births
Living people
Russian footballers
Association football defenders
Russian expatriate footballers
Expatriate footballers in Latvia
Expatriate footballers in Belarus
Expatriate footballers in Kazakhstan
Russian expatriate sportspeople in Latvia
FC Dynamo Moscow reserves players
FC Daugava players
FK Ventspils players
FC Shakhtyor Soligorsk players
FC Astana players
Kazakhstani footballers
Kazakhstan international footballers
Sportspeople from Belgorod Oblast